Macchindra Kambli (4 April 1947 – 30 September 2007) was a veteran Marathi theatre actor, director, and producer. Known for his humorous style, he brought Malvani dialect to the mainstream of Marathi theatre. He acted, directed and produced Malvani/ Marathi plays. He died on 30 September 2007 at the age of 60.

Early life
He was born in Rewandi village, Sindhudurg, Maharashtra. His father died when he was a child, and was raised by his mother.

Career
He had established Bhadrakali Productions, a banner known for its ethnic Malvani comedies.
His famous work includes:
Vastraharan – A play within a play about a group of actors attempting to stage the Vastraharan episode from Mahabharata, took the Marathi theatre by storm and established him in the Marathi theatre industry.
Pandgo Ilo re
Ghas re rama
Yeva Konkan Aplach Asa
Maza Pati Chhatrapati
Vai Varsha Panchavan
He had also acted in Marathi movie Painjan.

Politics and career
He briefly dabbled into politics by unsuccessfully contesting the Lok Sabha elections for the Indian National Congress from Rajapur in 1998. He got 1,52,724 votes against Suresh Prabhu of Shiv Sena who won with 2,17,766 votes. He later was associated with the Nationalist Congress Party. He remained president of Marathi theatre artiste organization, Akhil Bharatiya Marathi Natya Parishad.

References 

Male actors from Maharashtra
1952 births
2007 deaths
Indian male stage actors
Marathi actors
Indian theatre directors
Male actors in Marathi theatre
Indian National Congress politicians
Nationalist Congress Party politicians from Maharashtra